The Smålands Fotbollförbund (Småland Football Association) is one of the 24 district organisations of the Swedish Football Association. It administers lower tier football in the historical provinces of Småland and Öland.

Background 

Smålands Fotbollförbund, commonly referred to as Smålands FF, is the governing body for football in the historical province of Småland, which roughly corresponds with Jönköping County, Kalmar County and Kronoberg County. The Association currently has 343 member clubs.  Based in Jönköping, the Association's Chairman is Håkan Danielsson.

Affiliated Members 

The following clubs are affiliated to the Smålands FF:

Adelövs IK
Afrikanska Integration och IF
Agunnaryds IF
Aledals IK
Algutsrums IF
Alseda IK
Alsjöholms IF
Alsterbro IF
Alstermo IF
Alvesta GOIF
Anderstorps IF
Aneby SK
Angelstads IF
Ängö BK
Ängs SK
Ankarsrums IS
Annebergs GIF
Araby IF
Asby IF
Assyriska IF 
Assyriska Turab.ik JKP.
Bäckebo GOIF
Bäckseda IF
Bälaryds IK
Bankeryds SK
Barnarps IF
Berga GOIF
Bergkvara AIF
Besa FF
Björkö GOIK
Björkshults IF
Björnhults IF
BK Norra
Blackstads IF
Blankaholms BK
Blomstermåla IK
Bockara GOIF
Boda Bruk GOIF
Böda/Högby
Bodafors SK
Bolmsö IF
Bors SK
Bosnien-Hercegovina IF Emmaboda
Bosniska Föreningen Gislaved
Bottnaryds IF
Braås GOIF
Brandstorps IF
Bredaryds IK
Broaryds GOIF
Burseryds IF
Byxelkrok AIK
Dannäs SK
Degerhamns IF
Delary IF
Djursdala SK
Dörarps IF
Egnahems BK
Ekenässjöns IF
Ekhagens IF
Emmaboda IS
Eneryda IF
Euro United FC
Fågelfors IF
Fagerhults AIK
Fårbo FF
Färjestadens GOIF
Farstorps IK
FC Dardania
FC Ljungarum
FC Peking
FC Sjövik
FC Växjö
FC Vimmerby Fotboll
FK Älmeboda/Linneryd
FK Bosna Hercegovina
FK Jat Gislave
FK Liljan
FK Ljiljan Växjö
FK Stora Frö
Flerohopps GOIF
Flisby SK
Fliseryds IF
Flygsfors-Gadderås IF
Forserums IF
Forsheda IF
Fredriksdals BK
Frinnaryds IF
Frödinge-Brantestad SK
Furuby IF
Furusjö IF
Gislaveds FF
Gislaveds IS
Glömminge IF
Gnosjö IF
Gnosjö Spirit FC
GoIF Ling
Göteryds BK
Gränna AIS
Gransholms IF
Gripenbergs BK
Guddarps IF
Gullabo SK
Gullaboås IF
Gullringen United IF
Gullringens GOIF
Gunnebo IF
Habo IF
Hallaryds IF
Halltorps IK
Hammarsgärde BK
Hamneda GIK
Hångers IF
Häradsbäcks IF
Hestra Skid O SK
Hillerstorps GOIF
Hinneryds IF
Hjältevads IS
Hjältevads Mariannelunds IS
Hjorteds GoIF
Hjortsberga IF
Högsby FC
Högsby IK
Högsrums FF
Höken FF
Holsby SK
Hooks IF
Horda Allmänna IK
Höreda GOIF
Hossmo BK
Hovmantorp GoIF
Hovshaga AIF
Hovslätts IK
Hultagårds IF
Hulterstads AIK
Hultsfreds FK
Hultsjö IF
Husqvarna FF
Husqvarna IF
Hvetlanda GIF
IF Ariel
IF Eksjö Fotboll
IF Haga
IF Hallby FK
IF Hebe
IF Rejban
IF Stjärnan
IFK Berga
IFK Borgholm
IFK Gislaved
IFK Grimslöv
IFK Hult
IFK Kalmar
IFK Kåremo
IFK Lammhult
IFK Oskarshamn
IFK Österbymo
IFK Öxnehaga
IFK Påryd
IFK Stockaryd
IFK Torpsbruk
IFK Tuna
IFK Värnamo
IFK Västervik
IK Tord
IK Tord Ungdom
IK Tuna Södra
IK Vista
IK Wallgårda
Ingelstads IK
Internacional KIF Gislaved
Järnforsens AIK
Johansfors IF
Jönköpings BK
Jönköpings Södra IF
Jöransbergs Byalags IF
Kalmar AIK FK
Kalmar FF
Kalmar Södra IF
Kånna IF
Kärda IF
KF Omen FK
KF Sjöbo
Klevshults SK
Konga SK
Kosta IF
Kristinebergs FF
Kristvalla IK
Kroatiska Föreningen Croatia
Krokstorps IF
Kulltorps GOIF
Kvillsfors IF
Läckeby GOIF
Lagan FC
Lagans AIK
Landeryds GOIF
Landsbro IF FK
Långaryds IF
Långasjö GOIF
Långemåla FF
Långemåla IF
Lanna GOIF
Lekeryd-Svarttorps SK
Lenhovda IF
Lessebo GOIF
Liatorps IF
Lindås BK
Lindsdals IF
Ljungby FK
Ljungby IF
Ljungbyholms GOIF
Lommaryds IF
Madesjö IF
Målilla GOIF
Malmbäcks IF
Månsarps IF
Mariebo IK
Markaryds IF
Midingsbygdens IF
Missionsbåtsföreningen Shalom
Moheda IF
Mönsterås GOIF
Mörbylånga GOIF
Möre BK
Mörlunda GOIF
Myresjö IF
Näshults IF
Nässjö FF
Nickebo IK
Nissafors IS
Nöbbele BK
Norra Tångs BK
Norrahammars GIS
Norrahammars IK
Norrhults BK
Norrlidens IF
Nybro IF
Odensvi IF
Ormaryds IF
Orrefors IF
Osbruks IF
Oskarshamns AIK
Pauliströms IF
Persnäs AIF
Pjätteryds GOIF
Pukebergs BK
Räppe GOIF
Råslätt SK
Råstorp/Timsfors IF
Reftele GOIF
Rockneby IK
Rödsle BK
Rörviks IF
Rosenfors IK
Rottne IF
Ruda IF
Rumskulla GOIF
Runsten-Möckleby IF
Rydaholms GoIF
Ryds SK
Ryssby IF
S:t Sigfrids IF
Sandsbro Allmänna IK
Sävsjö FF
Sävsjöströms IF
SK Beduinerna
SK Lojal
Skede IF
Skeppshults BK
Skillingaryds IS
Skruvs IF
Slätthögs BOIF
Smålandsstenars GOIF
Smedby Boll O IK
Söderåkra AIK
Södra Vätterbygdens FF
Södra Vi IF
Solberga GOIF (Jange MVP)
Somaliska UF
Sommens AIF
Stenåsa-Sandby-Gårdby IF
Stensjöns IF
Storebro IF
Storsjö IF
Strömsnäsbruks IF
Svensk-Bosnisk IF
Tabergs SK
Tenhults IF
Timmernabbens IF
Tingsryd United FC
Tjust IF FF
Tolgs IF
Tord FC
Torpa AIS
Torpa FF
Torpa IF
Torsås GOIF
Totebo IF
Tranås FF
Tranås Syrianska FC
Traryds IF
Trekantens IF
Tvärskogs IF
Tyllinge IF
Unnaryds GOIF
Uråsa IF
Urshults IF
Väckelsångs IK
Värnamo Södra FF
Västboås GOIF
Västerviks AIS
Västerviks BoIS
Västerviks FF
Västra Torsås IF
Västrums IF
Växjö BK
Växjö FF
Växjö Norra IF
Vederslöv-Dänningelanda IF
Vetlanda FF
Vetlanda United IF
Vimmerby IF
Virestads IF
Virserums SGF
Visingsö AIS
Vislanda IF
Vissefjärda GOIF
Vittaryds IK
Vrigstads IF
Waggeryds IK
Åby/Tjureda IF
Åfors GOIF
Åryds IK
Åseda IF
Älghults IF
Älmhults IF
Ölmstads IS
Örjansklubben/Ramkvilla IF
Örserums IK
Örsjö IF
Österkorsberga IF
Östers IF
Överums IK

League Competitions 
Smålands FF run the following League Competitions:

Men's Football
Division 4  -  six sections
Division 5  -  six sections
Division 6  -  eleven sections

Women's Football
Division 3  -  three sections
Division 4  -  five sections
Division 5  -  eight sections

Footnotes

External links 
 Smålands FF Official Website 

Smalands
Football in Jönköping County
Football in Kronoberg County
Football in Kalmar County
1911 establishments in Sweden
Organizations established in 1911